Four ships of the Royal Navy have borne the name HMS Bridgewater, while one ship of the navy of the Commonwealth of England has also carried the name:

 Bridgewater was a 58-gun ship launched in 1654. After the English Restoration in 1660 she was renamed  and was blown up in 1673.
  was a 32-gun fifth rate launched in 1698. She was converted to a fireship in 1727, was rebuilt as a sixth rate in 1729 and was broken up in 1738.
  was a 20-gun sixth rate launched in 1740 and wrecked in 1743.
  was a 24-gun sixth rate launched in 1744. She was run ashore and burnt in 1758 to avoid being captured by the French.
  was a  sloop launched in 1928 and sold for breaking up in 1947.

Royal Navy ship names